Shirani in Iran may refer to either of the two villages:
 Shirani, Salmas
 Shirani, Sardasht